Carley Monika Ernst  (born 1 August 1994) is an Australian professional basketball player.

Career

WNBL
Ernst began her professional career in 2009 when she joined the Australian Institute of Sport (AIS) for the 2009–10 WNBL season. She managed just four games in her first season and went on to sit out the entire 2010–11 season after undergoing a second knee operation. She returned to the AIS line-up in 2011–12 and played out her first full season. She subsequently earned WNBL Rookie of the Year honours after averaging 9.1 points and 5.2 rebounds in 18 games.

In May 2012, Ernst signed with the Dandenong Rangers for the 2012–13 WNBL season. In 23 games for Dandenong, she averaged 6.1 points and 3.5 rebounds per game. During the 2013 off-season, she played for the Kilsyth Cobras.

In June 2013, Ernst signed with the Canberra Capitals for the 2013–14 WNBL season. In 24 games for Canberra, she averaged 9.4 points and 4.0 rebounds per game. During the 2014 off-season, she remained in Canberra and continue her development at Basketball Australia's Centre of Excellence.

On 11 June 2014, Ernst signed with the Adelaide Lightning for the 2014–15 WNBL season. In 22 games for Adelaide, she averaged 6.9 points and 3.5 rebounds per game. During the 2015 off-season, she played for the Waverley Falcons.

On 3 June 2015, Ernst signed with the Perth Lynx for the 2015–16 WNBL season. She helped lead the Lynx to a second place regular season finish with a 16–8 win–loss record, and went on to score 17 points in the team's semi-final win over the first-seeded Townsville Fire. With the win, the Lynx advanced to the WNBL grand final for the first time since 1999. There they were outclassed by the defending champion Townsville (who made it to the grand final via the preliminary final), losing the best-of-three series 2–0. She appeared in all 27 games for the Lynx in 2015–16, averaging 11.6 points and 3.6 rebounds per game. She remained in Perth during the 2016 off-season and joined the Kalamunda Eastern Suns of the State Basketball League.

On 28 April 2016, Ernst re-signed with the Lynx for the 2016–17 WNBL season. She helped lead the Lynx finish third in the regular season with a 15–9 win–loss record; the Lynx went on to lose 2–1 to the Dandenong Rangers in the semi-finals. Ernst appeared in all 27 games for the Lynx in 2016–17, averaging 13.3 points, 7.3 rebounds and 1.2 assists per game. Following her second season with the Lynx, Ernst joined the Frankston Blues for the 2017 SEABL season.

After a season with the Dandenong Rangers in 2017–18, she joined ACS Sepsi SIC in Romania in February 2018.

She returned to the Rangers for the 2018–19 season and then played for the Bendigo Spirit in 2019–20 and the 2020 WNBL Hub season. In January 2022, she joined the Melbourne Boomers for the rest of the 2021–22 season. With the Southside Flyers in 2022–23, she played her 250th WNBL game.

National team

Youth level
Ernst has been a member of both the Australian Under-17 and Under-19 national women's teams, winning bronze in 2013 with the Gems at the FIBA Under-19 World Championship.

Personal life
Ernst holds a dual-passport through her Serbian heritage.

Ernst had her first child in 2021.

References

External links

 WNBL profile
 WNBL Grand Final Player Profile

1994 births
Living people
Adelaide Lightning players
Australian Institute of Sport basketball (WNBL) players
Australian people of Serbian descent
Australian women's basketball players
Canberra Capitals players
Dandenong Rangers players
Perth Lynx players
Power forwards (basketball)
Serb diaspora sportspeople
Washington Mystics draft picks
20th-century Australian women
21st-century Australian women